N. minutus  may refer to:
 Nectophrynoides minutus, a toad species endemic to Tanzania
 Numenius minutus, the little curlew, a wader species which breeds in the far north of Siberia

See also
 List of Latin and Greek words commonly used in systematic names#M